Marigot  is the largest settlement of Saint Andrew Parish in northeastern Dominica. The village has a population of 2,676 people, and is home to a Fisheries Complex as well as the island's main airport. 

It is the birthplace of Wills Stratmore Stevens a local Educationist and B.O Robinson a former education officer. Along with Doctor Watts and local politician Edison James, (former Prime Minister)and cricket umpire Billy Doctrove. Marigot served as the leading community in Dominica at one point, with its people serving in all aspects of Government and local community development. Former police Commissioner O N Philip and Customs Comptroller Victoria Watty are also from the village of Marigot. Marigot can boast of being the leader in job creation agriculture and entrepreneurship. Marigot is also the home of former Government Senator Allan Jerry E Samuel, the youngest member to serve in parliament in the entire Caribbean region. It is also home to current leader of the Opposition Lennox Linton.

References

Populated places in Dominica
Saint Andrew Parish, Dominica